Drasteria hastingsii is a moth of the family Erebidae. It is found from British Columbia south to Oregon and California.

Taxonomy
It was formerly known as a subspecies of Drasteria mirifica.

References

External links

Drasteria
Moths described in 1878
Moths of North America